Huhla Col (Sedlovina Huhla \se-dlo-vi-'na 'huh-la\) is the ice-covered col of elevation 1131 m on Trinity Peninsula in Graham Land, Antarctica, which is linking Snegotin Ridge to the north to the west part of Louis-Philippe Plateau to the south.  It is overlooking Prelez Gap and Malorad Glacier to the west-northwest.

The col is named after the settlement of Huhla in Southern Bulgaria.

Location
German-British mapping in 1996.

Maps
 Trinity Peninsula. Scale 1:250000 topographic map No. 5697. Institut für Angewandte Geodäsie and British Antarctic Survey, 1996.
 Antarctic Digital Database (ADD). Scale 1:250000 topographic map of Antarctica. Scientific Committee on Antarctic Research (SCAR). Since 1993, regularly updated.

Notes

References
 Huhla Col. SCAR Composite Antarctic Gazetteer
 Bulgarian Antarctic Gazetteer. Antarctic Place-names Commission. (details in Bulgarian, basic data in English)

External links
 Huhla Col. Copernix satellite image

Mountain passes of Trinity Peninsula
Bulgaria and the Antarctic